This is a list of Polish television related events from 2004.

Events
4 January - Monika Brodka wins the third series of Idol.

Debuts
15 February - Pensjonat pod Różą (2004-2006)
4 November - Pierwsza miłość (2004–present)

Television shows

1990s
Klan (1997–present)

2000s
M jak miłość (2000–present)
Idol (2002-2005)
Na Wspólnej (2003–present)

Ending this year

Births

Deaths